Brydan Klein and Dane Propoggia were the defending champions, but Klein chose not to compete. Propoggia chose to compete with Stefano Ianni but lost in the first round to Alessandro Motti and Matteo Volante.
Pierre-Hugues Herbert and Maxime Teixeira defeated Alessandro Giannessi and João Sousa 6–4, 6–3 in the final.

Seeds

Draw

References 
 Main Draw

Banca dell'Adriatico Tennis Cup - Doubles
2013 - Doubles